The Rwanda Scouts Association (RSA; formerly in French Association des Scouts du Rwanda) is the national Scouting organization of Rwanda. Scouting in Rwanda was founded in 1940 and became a member of the World Organization of the Scout Movement (WOSM) in 1975. The coeducational association has 18,884 members (as of 2008).

History 

Scouting in Rwanda began in 1940. In the following years a number of different associations developed. In 1966, these formed a joint body, the Association des Scouts du Rwanda, which was admitted to WOSM in 1975.

The RSA  hosted the African Scout Conference from September 3 to 7, 2007, in La Palisse Hotel in Kigali. This conference, preceded by the 4th Africa Scout Youth Forum, held on August 30 to September 2, 2007, had as a topic Scouting, an education for a peaceful world, united against violence.

The RSA is supported by a number of European and American Scout associations, including the German Deutsche Pfadfinderschaft Sankt Georg, the Belgian Scouts en Gidsen Vlaanderen, the Association des Scouts du Canada and the Boy Scouts of America.

Program and ideals
The RSA is divided in four branches:
 Cub Scouts (ages 8 to 12)
 Scouts (ages 13 to 15)
 Companions (ages 16 to 18)
 Rover Scouts (ages 19 to 25)

The Scout Motto is Be Prepared, Uwe Tayari in Swahili, Ube Maso in Kinyarwanda, and Sois Prêt in French.

See also 
 Association des Guides du Rwanda

References

Further reading 
 World Scout Bureau (1979), Scouting 'Round the World. 1979 edition. 
 World Organization of the Scout Movement (1990), Scouting 'Round the World. 1990 edition.

External links 
 Official website
 Longer description of the RSA 
 Scout Network of the Great Lakes 

World Organization of the Scout Movement member organizations
Scouting and Guiding in Rwanda
Youth organizations established in 1966
1966 establishments in Rwanda